The Massaliote Periplus or Massiliote Periplus is a theoretical reconstruction of a sixth-century BC periplus, or sailing manual, proposed by historian Adolf Schulten.

Schulten believed a Massiliote Periplus had been versified in the lines of the Ora Maritima by Avienius. Schulten dated it to the 6th century BC. It describes a voyage from Oestriminis, modern Pointe du Raz, to Massalia, modern Marseille. Its existence has been denied by other scholars.

See also 

 Pytheas

References 

Peripluses
History of navigation
Lost books
Ancient Greek geography
Ancient Roman geography
6th-century BC books
Ancient Massalia
Nautical reference works